Glendale Life is an Armenian-American reality television series that aired on USArmenia TV. The series follows a group of Armenian friends living in Glendale, California and the surrounding communities of Los Angeles. The first season starred Anna Victoria "AV" DerParseghian, Lucy Samuelian, Veha Tarious, Arabo (Elcid) Sarkisian, Arman Mardigian, Lola Sarkisyan, Edgar Rostomyan, and Nadia (Nadejda) Hovhannisyan. The show received some backlash from members of the Armenian community for allegedly stereotyping.

Season one premiered on September 15, 2014 and ended on December 29, with the 2 reunion episodes airing on December 30, and 31, respectively. Season two premiered on March 2, 2015 and returned with AV Anna Victoria, Lucy and Veha. The departing Arabo, Arman, Edgar, Lola and Nadia were replaced by cast members Lousine Pogosian and Shprot "Ani" Tovmasyan. Beginning in episode 13, Shprot was mysteriously removed from the show and replaced with recurring stars, Luna Vagarshakian and Jacqueline Nerguizian.

Cast history

See also
 History of the Armenian Americans in Los Angeles
 Television in Armenia
 Shahs of Sunset, an Iranian-American reality television series with a similar concept, which has received backlash from the Iranian community for stereotyping

References

External links
 
 
 

Armenian American
Television shows set in Glendale, California
2010s American reality television series
Armenian diaspora
Armenian-American culture in California
2014 American television series debuts
2015 American television series endings